Leaman is a surname. Notable people with the surname include:

Chris Leaman (born 1980), British Liberal Democrat politician
Clifford Leaman, American classical saxophonist; professor of Saxophone at the University of South Carolina
David Leaman, Tasmanian author, structural geologist, geo-hydrologist and geophysicist
Graham Leaman (1920–1985), featured in five Doctor Who serials
Jack Leaman (1932–2004), head coach of the University of Massachusetts men's basketball team from 1966
Louisa Leaman (born 1976), writer and behaviour expert based in London, UK
Nate Leaman (born 1972), American ice hockey coach
Oliver Leaman, Professor of Philosophy and Zantker; professor of Judaic Studies
Richard Leaman (born 1956), British charity executive and former senior Royal Navy officer
 Carl Leaman born 1941, Selectman Town of Westport Conn., 1997-2005, Westport Board of Finance 1983-1995.